The Cascade River is a placename that can mean:
Cascade River (Alberta) (Canada), a tributary of the Bow River
Cascade River (Ontario) (Canada)
Cascade River (Mindanao) (Philippines)
Cascade River (Minnesota) (United States)
Cascade River (New Zealand)
Cascade River (Nunavut) (Canada), a minor river on the Meta Incognita Peninsula on Baffin Island
Cascade River (Tasmania) (Australia)
Cascade River (Washington) (United States)

See also
Cascade Creek (disambiguation)
Cascade (disambiguation)